The following is a list of prime ministers of Angola, from the establishment of the office of prime minister in 1975. The office was abolished in the constitution of 2010.

Prime ministers of Angola (1975–2010)

|- style="text-align:center;"
! colspan=9| People's Republic of Angola

|- style="text-align:center;"
| colspan=9| Post abolished (9 December 1978 – 19 July 1991)

|- style="text-align:center;"
! colspan=9| Republic of Angola

|- style="text-align:center;"
| colspan=8| Vacant (29 January 1999 – 6 December 2002)

Timeline

See also
Angola
President of Angola
List of presidents of Angola
Vice President of Angola
Prime Minister of Angola
List of colonial governors of Angola
List of heads of state of Democratic People's Republic of Angola
List of heads of government of Democratic People's Republic of Angola
Lists of office-holders
List of current heads of state and government

Notes

References

Sources
 
 
 
 
 

Angola, List of Prime Ministers of
Government of Angola
 
Prime Ministers
1975 establishments in Angola
2010 disestablishments in Angola
Prime ministers
Prime ministers